Banksia ser. Dryandra is a large series in the plant genus Banksia. It was treated at genus rank as Dryandra until 2007, when molecular evidence of paraphyly presented by Austin Mast and Kevin Thiele, the genus Dryandra was sunk into Banksia as a series within B. subg. Banksia.

Before 2007, 94 Dryandra species were recognised. In the transfer into Banksia, D. prionotes was overlooked, and B. subulata (awled honeypot) was transferred incertae sedis rather than in B. ser. Dryandra. D. prionotes has since been transferred into Banksia as Banksia prionophylla, but it was not explicitly placed in B. ser. Dryandra. The series therefore now consists of 92 species.

This is a list of Banksia ser. Dryandra species:

 Banksia acanthopoda
 Banksia acuminata
 Banksia alliacea
 Banksia anatona
 Banksia arborea (Yilgarn dryandra)
 Banksia arctotidis
 Banksia armata (prickly dryandra)
 Banksia aurantia
 Banksia bella (Wongan dryandra)
 Banksia bipinnatifida
 Banksia biterax
 Banksia borealis
 Banksia brunnea
 Banksia calophylla
 Banksia carlinoides (pink dryandra)
 Banksia catoglypta
 Banksia cirsioides
 Banksia columnaris
 Banksia comosa (Wongan dryandra)
 Banksia concinna
 Banksia corvijuga
 Banksia cynaroides
 Banksia cypholoba
 Banksia dallanneyi (couch honeypot)
 Banksia densa
 Banksia drummondii (Drummond's banksia)
 Banksia echinata
 Banksia epimicta
 Banksia erythrocephala
 Banksia falcata (prickly dryandra)
 Banksia fasciculata
 Banksia fililoba
 Banksia foliolata
 Banksia foliosissima
 Banksia formosa (showy banksia)
 Banksia fraseri
 Banksia fuscobractea
 Banksia glaucifolia
 Banksia heliantha (oak-leaved dryandra)
 Banksia hewardiana
 Banksia hirta
 Banksia horrida (prickly dryandra)
 Banksia idiogenes
 Banksia insulanemorecincta
 Banksia ionthocarpa
 Banksia kippistiana
 Banksia lepidorhiza
 Banksia meganotia
 Banksia mimica (summer honeypot)
 Banksia montana
 Banksia mucronulata (swordfish dryandra)
 Banksia nana (dwarf dryandra)
 Banksia nivea (honeypot dryandra)
 Banksia nobilis (golden dryandra)
 Banksia obovata (wedge-leaved dryandra)
 Banksia obtusa (shining honeypot)
 Banksia octotriginta
 Banksia pallida
 Banksia pellaeifolia
 Banksia platycarpa
 Banksia plumosa
 Banksia polycephala (many-headed dryandra)
 Banksia porrecta
 Banksia prolata
 Banksia proteoides (king dryandra)
 Banksia pseudoplumosa
 Banksia pteridifolia (tangled honeypot)
 Banksia purdieana
 Banksia rufa
 Banksia rufistylis
 Banksia sclerophylla
 Banksia seneciifolia
 Banksia serra (serrate-leaved dryandra)
 Banksia serratuloides
 Banksia sessilis (parrot bush)
 Banksia shanklandiorum
 Banksia shuttleworthiana (bearded dryandra)
 Banksia splendida (shaggy dryandra)
 Banksia squarrosa (pingle)
 Banksia stenoprion
 Banksia strictifolia
 Banksia stuposa
 Banksia subpinnatifida
 Banksia tenuis
 Banksia tortifolia
 Banksia tridentata (yellow dryandra)
 Banksia trifontinalis (Three Springs dryandra)
 Banksia undata (urchin dryandra)
 Banksia vestita (summer dryandra)
 Banksia viscida (sticky dryandra)
 Banksia wonganensis
 Banksia xylothemelia

See also
Prior to the 2007 transfer into Banksia, a number of rich infrageneric arrangements of Dryandra had been published; see:
 Brown's taxonomic arrangement of Dryandra (1810, 1830)
 Meissner's taxonomic arrangement of Dryandra (1856)
 Bentham's taxonomic arrangement of Dryandra (1870)
 George's taxonomic arrangement of Dryandra (1996)

References

Taxonomy of Banksia
 
Banksia ser. Dryandra